Nicolás Suárez Bremec (born 17 December 1977) is a Spanish-Uruguayan football goalkeeper who plays for Lupa Roma in Italy's Lega Pro.

Career
Bremec was signed by Vicenza on 31 January 2013. In July 2013 Bremec returned to Grosseto for their pre-season camp.

On 19 July 2013 he was signed by Cremonese.

On 14 July 2014 he was re-signed by Vicenza.

Career statistics

References

External links
Football-lineups.com profile

 

1977 births
Living people
Uruguayan footballers
Association football goalkeepers
El Tanque Sisley players
Defensor Sporting players
Sud América players
Danubio F.C. players
S.S. Arezzo players
Ascoli Calcio 1898 F.C. players
Calcio Foggia 1920 players
F.C. Grosseto S.S.D. players
L.R. Vicenza players
Taranto F.C. 1927 players
U.S. Cremonese players
Serie B players
Serie C players
Expatriate footballers in Italy
Uruguayan expatriates in Italy
Uruguayan people of Spanish descent
Footballers from Barcelona